Dahra (also Dahra Djoloff or Dara) is a town of commune status located in the Louga Region of Senegal at roughly 264 km from Dakar, to which it is connected via the N3 road. It is near the ISRA Centre de recherché zootechniques and 40 km from the old King of Djoloff's residence (yang-yang) named Alboury Ndiaye. The town has about 30,000 residents and the main activity is agriculture and animal breeding. 

Dahra is popular because of the weekly market, which gathers many stockbreeders and tradesmen from around the country.

References 

Populated places in Louga Region
Communes of Senegal